Marián Kovář (born 13 August 1993) is a Czech footballer, who plays as a forward for Hanácká Slavia Kroměříž. He has represented his country at under-21 level.

References

External links

1993 births
Living people
Czech footballers
Association football forwards
Czech Republic under-21 international footballers
Czech First League players
1. FC Slovácko players
FK Jablonec players
FC Vysočina Jihlava players